Adriana Brandão Behar (born February 14, 1969, in Rio de Janeiro) is one of the most outstanding volleyball players of her generation.

Behar is Jewish.  She moved to beach volleyball in 1993, after playing in the Brazilian women's national indoor volleyball squad. Pairing with Shelda Bede, she has won more than 30 international tournaments of beach volleyball as well as two Olympic medals. Together, they have won more than 1,000 matches and 114 titles.

Of Lebanese Jewish origin, she is the only Brazilian athlete in the International Jewish Sports Hall of Fame, next to universal sport legends like the American swimmer Mark Spitz and the former Formula 1 pilot Jody Scheckter.

Recognition
She was recognized as one of the BBC's 100 women of 2017.

See also
 List of notable Jewish volleyball players

References

External links
 
 

1969 births
Living people
Brazilian women's volleyball players
Brazilian women's beach volleyball players
Beach volleyball players at the 2000 Summer Olympics
Beach volleyball players at the 2004 Summer Olympics
Olympic beach volleyball players of Brazil
Olympic silver medalists for Brazil
Olympic medalists in beach volleyball
Medalists at the 2004 Summer Olympics
Beach volleyball players at the 1999 Pan American Games
Jewish women's volleyball players
Brazilian Sephardi Jews
Brazilian people of Lebanese-Jewish descent
Brazilian people of Portuguese descent
Volleyball players from Rio de Janeiro (city)
Federal University of Rio de Janeiro alumni
Medalists at the 2000 Summer Olympics
Pan American Games gold medalists for Brazil
Pan American Games medalists in volleyball
BBC 100 Women
Competitors at the 1998 Goodwill Games
Competitors at the 2001 Goodwill Games
Goodwill Games medalists in beach volleyball
Medalists at the 1999 Pan American Games
Sportspeople of Lebanese descent